Mat Zemlya (Matka Ziemia or Matushka Zeml'ja) is the Moist (or Water) Earth Mother and is probably the oldest deity in Slavic mythology besides Marzanna. She is also called Mati Syra Zemlya meaning Mother Damp Earth or Mother Moist Earth. Her identity later blended into that of Mokosh.

Mythology
In the early Middle Ages, Mati Syra Zemlya was one of the most important deities in the Slavic world. Slavs made oaths by touching the Earth, and sins were confessed into a hole in the Earth before death. She was worshipped in her natural form and was not given a human personage or likeness. Since the adoption of Christianity in all Slavic lands, she has been identified with Mary, the mother of Jesus.

An example of her importance is seen in this traditional invocation to Matka Ziema, made with a jar of hemp oil:

East – "Mother Earth, subdue every evil and unclean being so that he may not cast a spell on us nor do us any harm."
West – "Mother Earth, engulf the unclean power in thy boiling pits, and in thy burning fires." 
South – "Mother Earth, calm the winds coming from the South and all bad weather. Calm the moving sands and whirlwinds."
North – "Mother Earth, calm the North winds and clouds, subdue the snowstorms and the cold."
The jar, which held the oil, is buried after each invocation and offering is made at each Quarter. (Slavonic mythology 1977:287)

Old Slavic beliefs seem to attest some awareness of an ambivalent nature of the Earth: it was considered men's cradle and nurturer during one's lifetime, and, when the time of death came, it would open up to receive their bones, as if it were a "return to the womb".

The imagery of the terre humide ("moist earth") also appears in funeral lamentations either as a geographical feature (as in Lithuanian and Ukrainian lamentations) or invoked as Mère-Terre humide ("Mother Moist Earth").

Cultic practices
Up until World War I and the fall of the Russian Empire, peasant women would perform a rite to prevent against plague by plowing a furrow around the village and calling on the protection of the Earth spirits by shrieking.

Related characters
The Slavic bogatyr Mikula Selyaninovich, or Mikula the Villager, is closely connected with Mat Zemlya.

See also 
 Māra in Latvian folklore
 Mother Russia
 Mother Earth

Footnotes

Notes

Further reading
 Pushkina, V.. "ОБРАЗ МАТЕРИ - СЫРОЙ ЗЕМЛИ КАК ЭКСПЛИКАЦИЯ АКСИОЛОГИЧЕСКИХ ДОМИНАНТ ВОСТОЧНЫХ СЛАВЯН" [THE IMAGE OF THE MOTHER - RAW EARTH AS THE EXPLICATION OF AXIOLOGICAL DOMINANTS EASTERN SLAVS]. In: Аксиологический диапазон художественной литературы : сборник научных статей. - Витебск: ВГУ имени П. М. Машерова, 2017. pp. 290–293.

External links
 Day of the Divine Mother of Herbs

Agricultural goddesses
Fertility goddesses
Slavic goddesses
Earth goddesses
Creator goddesses
Supernatural beings identified with Christian saints